José Antonio Ruiz de Padron (1757–1823) was a noted Spanish politician and Catholic priest. He was a critic of the Inquisition and promoter of a more enlightened Catholic faith. In 1785 he went to Pennsylvania and met and debated with George Washington and Benjamin Franklin. In November 2012, he was awarded the Distinguished Honorary Favorite Son of the Island of La Gomera.

References

Further reading 

 Guimerá Peraza, Marcos. (1967). Los diputados doceañistas canarios. Santa Cruz de Tenerife: Cabildo Insular, Aula de Cultura.
 Millares Torres, Agustín. (1982). Biografías de canarios célebres. Las Palmas de Gran Canaria: Edirca
Mora Morales, Manuel. (2011). La isla transparente. Tomo I, Nuestro Ruiz de Padrón: [la fantástica vida del hombre que derribó la inquisición española]: novela histórica. Canarias: Malvasía.
Mora Morales, Manuel. (2012). Canarias. Tomo II, Nuestro Ruiz de Padrón: [la fantástica vida del hombre que derribó la inquisición española]: novela histórica. Canarias: Malvasía.
 Villalba Hervas, Miguel. (1897). Ruiz de Padrón y su tiempo. Introducción al un estudio sobre historia contemporánea de España. Madrid: Victoriano Suárez.

Politicians from the Canary Islands
1757 births
1823 deaths